Miko Marks is an American country singer. She was born in Flint, Michigan. She attended Grambling State University.  She later moved to San Francisco. Marks was named Best New Country Artist at the 2006 New Music Weekly Awards.

Career
Marks released her debut single, "Freeway Bound," in 2005. It was followed by her debut album, also titled Freeway Bound, which was released on September 13, 2005. Three further singles ("Kickin' Back," "Mama," and "Don't Come Cryin' to Me") were released from the album in 2006. "Mama" featured Marks' first music video, which included a guest appearance by Erykah Badu assuming the title role. Her second studio album, It Feels Good, followed in 2007 after the release of lead-off single "Locked and Loaded." Both were produced by Ron Cornelius and released under the Mirrome Records imprint.

In his review of It Feels Good, Stewart Mason of allmusic awarded the album 3 and 1/2 stars, drawing comparisons to the Dixie Chicks and Gretchen Wilson while commenting that the album "clicks on every level, making it a solidly enjoyable neo-traditionalist country listen."

In 2021, Marks released “Our Country,” her first new album in over a decade. The album's lead single and music video are "We Are Here".

In October 2022, Marks performed on the Grand Ole Opry for the first time. According to CMT, her performance received two standing ovations.

Discography

Studio albums

Extended Plays

Singles

Music videos

Awards and nominations

References

External links 
 Official Site

21st-century African-American women singers
American country singer-songwriters
Living people
African-American country musicians
Year of birth missing (living people)
Country musicians from Michigan
African-American songwriters
Singer-songwriters from Michigan
People from Flint, Michigan